The Americana Music Association is a not-for-profit trade organization advocating for American Roots Music around the world.  It is a network for Americana artists, radio stations, record labels, publishers, and others with the goal of developing an infrastructure that will boost visibility and economic viability. Additionally, the organization works to increase brand recognition of Americana music and its artists. The Association produces events throughout the year, including the annual AMERICANAFEST: The Americana Music Festival and Conference and the Americana Music Honors & Awards, typically held together in the fall. The association also manages and publishes radio airplay charts.  It publishes newsletters, conducts market research, and disseminates information about important events in the Americana community.

History of the Americana Music Association
Since 1999, the Americana Music Association has helped American roots music reach wider recognition in the general public. What began as an informal gathering of dedicated colleagues has grown into a movement endorsed by major media and important artists. The Recording Academy added the category of “Best Americana Album” in 2009, and Merriam-Webster included the musical term into the dictionary in 2011.

The Americana Music Association is a resource for upcoming artists, songwriters, musicians, and producers. Today, Americana is one of the best-selling music genres according to Billboard’s Top 20 album charts - with artists like Mumford & Sons, The Avett Brothers, The Civil Wars, The Lumineers, and more, becoming the mainstream and not the exception. 
 
In the late 1990s, a group of about 30 volunteers from radio, record labels, and media met informally at the South by Southwest music industry conference in Austin, Texas, to discuss collective action that could help the Americana community, including the possibility of a trade association. A facilitated retreat in October 1999 galvanized the idea, and the Americana Music Association was born.

Early the following year, the Association hosted its first annual Americana Night at South by Southwest, and then in September 2000, the association held its first convention at the Hilton Suites in downtown Nashville, featuring showcase performances by Sam Bush, Rhonda Vincent, Rodney Crowell, and Jim Lauderdale. The Americana Honors and Awards were added to the convention in year three. Americana icons Emmylou Harris, Billy Joe Shaver, and T-Bone Burnett were given lifetime achievement awards for performing, songwriting, and executive achievement, respectively. After much behind-the-scenes planning, the audience was treated to a surprise performance by Johnny Cash and June Carter Cash with members of the Cash family. Johnny accepted the association's first-ever “Spirit of Americana” Free Speech Award with a recitation of his song-poem “Ragged Old Flag,” and then, despite his failing health, he and June led their family band through a set of songs that reached back through time. It turned out to be the last public performance the Cashes would ever give together.

Over time, the fall event attracted larger groups of fans and industry conferees. In response, the organization formally changed the name of its event to the Americana Music Festival and Conference, welcoming not just those in the business but anyone with a passion for music. By 2008, the event had expanded to four days, moved its Awards Show to the historic Ryman Auditorium, and attracted nearly 1,000 industry professionals, plus a cumulative total of over 12,000 visitors for the nighttime showcases.

Each year’s musical performances have been as varied as Americana itself: Levon Helm’s Ramble at the Ryman; John Fogerty in a packed Mercy Lounge; Grace Potter with the Waybacks channeling the Grateful Dead at the Cannery Ballroom; then newcomers, The Avett Brothers at the Station Inn with an audience of 150. The Civil Wars performed a breathtaking rendition of “Barton Hollow” at the Gibson Showroom, which streamed live on Music City Roots, where the world took notice. An unannounced duet by Robert Plant and Buddy Miller was noted by acerbic music industry blogger Bob Lefsetz: “Their passion was palpable. My only desire was to get closer. My only hope was that the music would never end.”

The annual fall festival and conference has attracted some of the most important figures in the history of Americana Roots Music, including Mavis Staples, Gregg Allman, Judy Collins, John Prine, Joan Baez, Emmylou Harris, Steve Earle, Rodney Crowell, Solomon Burke and Lyle Lovett.

Paste journalist Geoffrey Himes declares the Americana Honors, “the best awards show in the world,”  and author Ann Patchett, writing for The New York Times, proclaimed the Americana movement as “the coolest music scene today.”

Fueled by established musicians Bonnie Raitt, Booker T. Jones and Richard Thompson, and the next generation of stars including Alabama Shakes, Punch Brothers and John Fullbright, along with music industry heavyweights, the 2012 Americana Music Festival and Conference saw over 15,000 fans, 300 artists and more than 1,200 music industry professionals attend the five-day event.
 
The Association’s capstone event, the Americana Music Honors & Awards, aired live nationally on September 12 via AXS TV, broadcast via SiriusXM, WSM radio, and streamed by NPR.org. Musical segments of the Americana Honors & Awards show appeared on PBS nationwide during a special presentation: "ACL Presents: Americana Music Festival 2012," beginning November 10, 2012, in the Austin City Limits time slot. Additional international radio broadcasts via BBC2 and Voice of America began airing September 23.

Founding Council
Founding Council of The Americana Music Association:

Al Moss
Beverly Paul
Bill Wence,
Brad Paul
Brad Hunt
Chris Marino
Dan Einstein
Dan Herrington
Dennis Lord
Grant Alden
Greg Hils (RIP)
J.D. May
Jack Emerson (RIP)
Jeff Weiss
Jessie Scott
Jim Caligiuri
Jon Grimson
Leslie Rouffé
Marie Arsenault
Mike Hays (RIP)
Paul Schatzkin
Renee Grace McIntosh
Rod Seagram
Scott Robinson
Stephen Bond Garvan
Steve Wilkison
Sue Fawver
Tiffany Suiters Rizzo
Traci Thomas
Van Tucker

See also
 Americana Music Festival & Conference
 List of music organizations in the United States

References

External links
 Americana Music Association website
 Americana Radio Chart

Music organizations based in the United States
Americana music